Merging is a one-act play written by Charles Messina.

The play debuted at the Players Theatre in Greenwich Village on October 25, 2007, during the theater's Shortened Attention Span Horror Festival. It was voted Best Play of the festival.

Plot 

An estranged couple is reunited after their child's disappearance, but their reunion resurrects old resentments about Frank's past love affair and Cheryl's resulting emotional breakdown as the two "revisit their relationship and try to unravel the painful mystery of their missing child."

Reviews 

In an October 29, 2007 review of the show, Broadwayworld.com said "...(the actors) gave audiences at the Players Theatre's Shortened Attention Span Horror Festival a jolt that they may not have been expecting – one of pure and unbridled acting intensity.  Cerbone, Ferranti, and Mingione's performances delighted and horrified audiences and propelled Merging to Best Play in Festival honors by receiving the most audience votes of any other play in the fest."

Cast 
 Jason Cerbone as Frank Yale
 Gina Ferranti as Cheryl Yale
 Ernest Mingione as the Detective

Film version 

A film version of the play, also written and directed by Messina and starring the original cast, was released in 2009. It was co-produced by NahNotOutsideMyHouse! Productions.

References

2007 plays
American plays